Cook Islands is competing at the 2013 World Aquatics Championships in Barcelona, Spain on July 20 to August 4, 2013.

Open water swimming

Cook Islands has qualified one swimmer in open water competition.

Men

References

External links
Barcelona 2013 Official Site

Nations at the 2013 World Aquatics Championships
2013 in Cook Islands sport
Cook Islands at the World Aquatics Championships